Orbivirus is a genus of double-stranded RNA viruses in the family Reoviridae and subfamily Sedoreovirinae. Unlike other reoviruses, orbiviruses are arboviruses. They can infect and replicate within a wide range of arthropod and vertebrate hosts. Orbiviruses are named after their characteristic doughnut-shaped capsomers (orbis in Latin means ring).

Many orbiviruses are transmitted by ticks or haematophagus insect vectors (Culicoides, mosquitoes and sand flies) and have a wide host range that includes cattle, goats and sheep, wild ruminants, equids, camelids, marsupials, sloths, bats, birds, large canine and feline carnivores, and humans.

The three economically most important orbiviruses are Bluetongue virus, African horse sickness virus, and Epizootic hemorrhagic disease virus, all of which are transmitted by Culicoides species. The genus contains 22 species and at least 130 different serotypes.

History 
In 1719, African horse sickness virus (AHSV) caused the first major recorded orbivirus epidemic, killing 1,500 animals. The most historically significant outbreak of orbivirus occurred in 1854–1855, when AHSV infected 70,000 horses. AHSV was discovered to be a virus in 1900 and bluetongue disease followed shortly thereafter in 1905. Outbreaks have occurred sporadically in the 20th and 21st centuries.

Virology

Structure

The virons are nonenveloped particles that are 70–80 nm in diameter. The virus particles are spherical in appearance and have icosahedral symmetry. An outer and an inner capsid layer surround the genome, and have T=13 and T=2 symmetry, respectively. The viron is constructed of two concentric protein shells, the subcore layer which contain 120 copies/particle of the VP3 and the core-surface layer composed of 780 copies/particle of the VP7. VP1, VP4, and VP6 are minor enzymatic proteins that are packaged along with the 10 genome segments within the central space of the virus core. The orbivirus outer-capsid layer is composed of two additional structural proteins (VP2 and VP5) which mediate cell-attachment and penetration during initiation of infection. The outer-capsid proteins are more variable than the core proteins and most of the non-structural proteins and the specificity of their reactions with neutralising antibodies determines the virus serotype.

Genome

These viruses have double-stranded RNA genomes, so are classified as Class III viruses. Their genome is linear and is segmented into 10 segments of various lengths.  One copy of each gene segment is packaged per virion.  In most cases, each gene segment encodes a single open reading frame (ORF). The genome encodes seven major structural proteins (VP1–VP7) and three major nonstructural proteins (NS1–NS3). Exceptions to the one gene–one protein rule are segment 9 (Seg-9) and segment 10 (Seg-10), both of which encode two nearly identical proteins initiated from in-phase AUG codons close together near the upstream termini (VP6 and VP6a encoded by Seg-9: NS3 and NS3a encoded by Seg-10).

An ORF spans almost the entire length of genome segment 9 and encodes VP6 (the viral helicase). A second ORF  (OrfX) is also present on this segment and encodes a fourth nonstructural protein (NS4), which was predicted from sequence analysis of various orbiviruses including segment 9 of Great Island virus which contained a long NS4 ORF (around 21kDa). The existence of NS4 was experimentally confirmed in both insect-borne and tick-borne orbiviruses in 2011.

NS1 is the most abundant protein in bluetongue virus infected cells. It forms tubules that may be involved in translocation of progeny virus particles to the cell membrane. NS2 is phosphorylated by cellular kinases and is an important matrix protein of the granular viral inclusion bodies that form within the cytoplasm of infected cells. These viral inclusion bodies act as the centres of viral replication. The membrane glycoproteins NS3 and NS3a are expressed in large numbers in insect cells, but not in mammalian cells. They are involved in the release of progeny virus particles from infected cells and may be involved in determination of both vector competence and virulence.

Life cycle
Many orbiviruses preferentially infect vascular endothelial cells. Orbiviruses enter the host cell by endocytosis and the outer capsid is subsequently removed.  The whole cycle of viral replication takes place within the cytoplasm of the host cell. Transcription of the viral genome into mRNA occurs within the core particle and mRNA is translated into proteins using the host cell ribosomes. Viral proteins are synthesized 2–14 days after initial infection. New virons self-assemble within the cytoplasm and are then released from the host cell by budding.  During the budding process, they transiently acquire a lipid envelope which can be detected for a short period of time following their release, but this is subsequently lost.

Pathogenesis
Orbiviruses primarily cause diseases in animals.  The different Orbivirus species have different host specificities.  Orbiviruses are vector-borne pathogens transmitted between vertebrate hosts by vectors such as mosquitoes, midges, gnats, sandflies, and ticks.  Bluetongue virus (BTV) is an Orbivirus that causes bluetongue disease in sheep, cattle, goats, and wild ungulates.  BTV has been in the forefront of molecular studies for last three decades and now represents one of the best understood viruses at the molecular and structural levels. Other species of orbiviruses are responsible for other diseases of animals such as African horse sickness and equine encephalosis virus.

Taxonomy

Species

The genus Orbivirus contains the following species:

African horse sickness virus
Bluetongue virus
Changuinola virus
Chenuda virus
Chobar Gorge virus
Corriparta virus
Epizootic hemorrhagic disease virus
Equine encephalosis virus
Eubenangee virus
Great Island virus
Above Maiden virus
Ieri virus
Lebombo virus
Orungo virus
Palyam virus
Peruvian horse sickness virus
St Croix River virus
Umatilla virus
Wad Medani virus
Wallal virus
Warrego virus
Wongorr virus
Yunnan orbivirus

Serogroups

The genus is divided into several (at least 14) serogroups. The serogroups are divided in some cases into subgroups. A number of member viruses have yet to be assigned to a serogroup. The serogroups are differentiated on the basis of a fourfold or greater difference in antibody based tests. These tests include ELISAs and complement fixation tests.

Vector groups

Member viruses are transmitted by midges (Culicoides), mosquitoes, and ticks. The viruses transmitted by a particular type of vector are generally related both genetically and serologically.

See also
 Animal viruses

References

External links
 Medscape: Orbivirus, on: emedicine.com
 Peter Mertens et al.: Draft of the orbivirus genus description for the ICTV Seventh Report, via Web Archive
 Mertens, (2001) Orbiviruses and Bluetongue virus. In: Encyclopedia of Life Sciences. John Wiley & Sons, Ltd: Chichester. www.els.net 
 Viralzone: Orbivirus
 ICTV

Orbiviruses
Animal viral diseases
Virus genera
Mammal diseases
Bird diseases